LAByrinth Theater Company is a non-profit, Off-Broadway theater company based in New York City. Led by Philip Seymour Hoffman and John Ortiz for many years, its artistic director is Ortiz. The New York Times described it in 2014 as "an ethnically diverse downtown troupe that has mounted several critically acclaimed new works".

History 
LAByrinth Theater Company was founded in 1992 by 13 actors looking for "a home where the group, for three hours each week, could engage in a variety of theatrical exercises designed to push each others’ limits and bind together into a tightly knit, uninhibited and impassioned ensemble – one in which each member is given the opportunity and support not only to act, but to write, direct, produce, sweep, paint, hang lights, etcetera." This expansion of artists into the exploration of new aspects of theater remains one of the primary goals of Labyrinth, and the company is fostering a new generation of writers and directors who come from acting backgrounds.

In 2017, Dane Laffrey, Scott Zielinski, and Michael Urie won Obie Awards presented by the American Theatre Wing.

Notable members

References

External links

Theatre companies in New York City
Off-Broadway theaters
Performing groups established in 1992